SAE Type 630 stainless steel (more commonly known as 17-4 PH, or simply 17-4; also known as UNS S17400) is a grade of martensitic precipitation hardened stainless steel. It contains approximately 15–17.5% chromium and 3–5% nickel, as well as 3–5% copper. The name comes from the chemical makeup which is approximately 17% chromium and 4% nickel. SUS630 is the same as 17-4PH, and they both refer to the same grade.

Properties
17-4 can be heat treated to high levels of strength and hardness, and features corrosion resistance and machinability comparable to austenitic 304 stainless. Being martensitic, 17-4 is magnetic.

17-4 is capable of being hardened up to approximately 44 Rc when heat treated to condition H900.

Overaging (aging beyond the peak strength condition) improves resistance to stress corrosion cracking.

Applications
Specific applications for 17-4 include the petroleum and chemical industries, as well as use in aircraft parts.

Composition

References

External links

Stainless steel